The Texas Highland Lakes are a chain of fresh water reservoirs in Central Texas formed by dams on the lower Colorado River. The Texas Colorado River winds southeast from West Texas to Matagorda Bay and the Gulf of Mexico.

The lower Colorado River basin has a history of major flooding. The Lower Colorado River Authority (LCRA) built the dams to manage floods and generate hydroelectric power in the 1930s and 1940s.

Lady Bird Lake (formerly Town Lake) and the respective Longhorn Dam are sometimes considered the seventh "honorary" lake and dam of the Highland Lakes despite being commissioned and managed by the City of Austin instead of the LCRA. Unlike the other reservoirs in the chain which were constructed primarily to prevent flooding and generate hydroelectric power, Lady Bird Lake was constructed in order to provide a cooling pond for the city's new power plant.

The two largest lakes—Buchanan and Travis—are the reservoirs that store water supply for the region. The smaller lakes—Inks, LBJ, Marble Falls and Austin—are pass-through lakes that are operated within a certain range.

In all, the six official dams of the Highland Lakes have a hydroelectric power production capacity of 295MW, with Mansfield Dam alone able to provide 108MW. While Longhorn Dam has no hydroelectric production capacity, Lady Bird Lake served as a cooling pond for the 100MW Seaholm Power Plant and the 550MW Holly Street Power Plant until they were closed in 1996 and 2007, respectively.

References

External links
Highland Lakes
Lower Colorado River Authority

Protected areas of Burnet County, Texas
Protected areas of Llano County, Texas
Protected areas of Travis County, Texas
Reservoirs in Texas
Geography of Austin, Texas
Bodies of water of Burnet County, Texas
Bodies of water of Llano County, Texas
Bodies of water of Travis County, Texas
1940s establishments in Texas
Lower Colorado River Authority